Bernard Perrut (born 24 January 1957 in Villefranche-sur-Saône, Rhône, France) is a French politician who served as a deputy of the National Assembly of France, representing the Rhône's 9th constituency from 1997 to 2022. A member of the Republicans, he previously was the mayor of Villefranche-sur-Saône from 2008 to 2017.

References

1957 births
Living people
People from Villefranche-sur-Saône
Republican Party (France) politicians
Liberal Democracy (France) politicians
Union for a Popular Movement politicians
The Republicans (France) politicians
The Social Right
Mayors of places in Auvergne-Rhône-Alpes
Deputies of the 12th National Assembly of the French Fifth Republic
Deputies of the 13th National Assembly of the French Fifth Republic
Deputies of the 14th National Assembly of the French Fifth Republic
Deputies of the 15th National Assembly of the French Fifth Republic
Members of Parliament for Rhône